Double Time is the second studio album by singer/guitarist Leon Redbone, released in 1977. It peaked at #38 on the Billboard pop album charts.

Track listing
Side One
"Diddy Wa Diddie" (Blind Blake) – 3:05
"Nobody's Sweetheart" (Ernie Erdman, Gus Kahn, Billy Meyers, Elmer Schoebel) – 2:13
"Shine On Harvest Moon" (Nora Bayes, Jack Norworth) – 3:21
"Crazy Blues" (trad. arr. Perry Bradford) – 4:16
"Mississippi Delta Blues" (Jack Neville, Jimmie Rodgers) – 1:44

Side Two
"Mr. Jelly Roll Baker" (Traditional) – 3:43
"My Melancholy Baby" (Ernie Burnett, George A. Norton, Maybelle Watson) – 3:10
"The Sheik of Araby" (Harry Smith, Ted Snyder, Francis Wheeler) – 2:31
"Mississippi River Blues" (Rodgers) – 3:05
"Winin' Boy Blues" (Jelly Roll Morton) – 4:17
"If We Never Meet Again This Side of Heaven" (Albert E. Brumley) – 3:18

Personnel
Source:

Leon Redbone – vocals, guitar, throat tromnet, background whistling on "Crazy Blues"
Milt Hinton – double bass
Jo Jones – drums
Bob Greene – piano
Don McLean – banjo on "Mississippi Delta Blues"
Eric Weissberg – banjo on "Shine On Harvest Moon"
Dominic Cortese – accordion
Jonathan Dorn – tuba
Yusef Lateef – soprano saxophone on "Mississippi River Blues"
Ed Polcer – trumpet
Ed Barefield – clarinet
Vic Dickenson – trombone
Dick Rath – trombone
Joe Wilder – trumpet on "Nobody's Sweetheart"
Kermit Moore – cello
Selwart Clarke – viola
Lewis Elgy – violin
Sanford Allen – violin
Captain Billy's Whiz Bang (William Kruse, Frederick Mount III, Andrew Smith, Mark S. Bentley) - backing vocals on "Shine On Harvest Moon"
The Dixie Hummingbirds (Ira Tucker Sr., James Walker, James Davis, Beachy Thompson) - backing vocals on "If We Never Meet Again This Side of Heaven"
Jerry Teifer - background whistling on "Shine On Harvest Moon"
Beachy Thompson - background whistling on "If We Never Meet Again This Side of Heaven"
Al Cohn – horn arrangements on "Crazy Blues", "Mr. Jelly Roll Baker" and "Diddy Wah Diddy"
William S. Fischer – string arrangements on "Mississippi Delta Blues", "Melancholy Baby" and "Shine On Harvest Moon"

Production notes

Joel Dorn – producer
Hal Willner – associate producer
Bob Liftin – recording and remix engineer
Vince McGarry – additional recording and mastering engineer
Neil Brody – additional recording engineer
Benno Friedman – backliner photo
Michael Horen and Leon Redbone – cover art

Charts

Album

References

External links

Leon Redbone albums
1977 albums
Albums produced by Joel Dorn
Warner Records albums